Lisca is a  hill in the eastern part of the Sava Hills in southeastern Slovenia, northwest of Sevnica, north of the Sava, and south of Gračnica Creek. It is the most frequently visited hiking destination in the Sava Hills.

Etymology 

Geography 
The hill has two summits: Lisca and Little Lisca. At Lisca there is a meteorological station, the only one in Slovenia with a meteorological radar, and a ski slope. At Mala Lisca, there are three paragliding take-off sites.

At , the Jurko Lodge stands below the peak, built in 1972 at the site of the previous structures. It is named after Blaž Jurko (1859–1944), an early teacher and hiking pioneer that built the first hut on Lisca in 1902. Next to it stands the Tonček Lodge, built in 1952 after the old one was burned during World War II by the Partisans. It was named after Tonček Čebular, the president of the Lisca Sevnica Mountaineering Club, who led the rebuilding. Below the Tonček Lodge there is a chapel dedicated to the Mother of God, built in 1939 at the initiative of Blaž Jurko. Six names are written on plaques around its door: the nieces and nephews of the priest that consecrated it.

Weather station 

The Slovenian Environment Agency combines data from Meteosat and the meteorological radar at Lisca for accurate precipitation forecasts.

Ascent routes 
The main path leading to the top is the Jurko Trail, named after Blaž Jurko. It leads from the village of Breg through the village of Razbor to the top of Lisca. An asphalt road leads to the Tonček Lodge from a pass between the Sava and Gračnica valleys.

The Jurko Trail also leads past a church dedicated to St. Judoc on the western slope of Lisca. There, three paths leading to the top join. An auction of pork hocks and cured sausage has taken place at St. Judoc's Church every Shrove Sunday since 1997, reviving a tradition that had disappeared for a period.

Other uses 
The company Lisca, a major lingerie manufacturer, is named after the hill.

References

External links

 Lisca. Hribi.net. Retrieved 6 March 2012.
 Lisca Peak. VR panorama (surround photography). Hribi.net. Retrieved 6 March 2012.
 Radar image of precipitation in Slovenia. Sent from the Lisca Peak Radar Station every 10 minutes. Geopedia.si, ARSO. Retrieved 6 March 2012.

Hills of Slovenia
Municipality of Sevnica